The Swimming competition at the 17th Central American and Caribbean Games was swum in November 1993 in Ponce, Puerto Rico. It featured events in a long course (50m) pool.

Results

Men

Women

References
 The Oldest Regional Games: Central American & Caribbean Sports Games, by Enrique Montesinos. Published by CACSO in 2009; retrieved 2012-04.

Swimming at the Central American and Caribbean Games
1993 in swimming
1993 Central American and Caribbean Games